Poole Grammar School (commonly abbreviated to PGS) is a selective, all‐boys grammar school and academy in the coastal town of Poole in Dorset, on the south coast of England. It is a member of the South West Academic Trust (SWAT). The school was a mathematics and computing school, with an additional specialism, cognition, added in 2006.

It is situated in the north of Poole, on the A349 (known locally as Gravel Hill), in a campus built in 1966, with various additions made since.

Admissions
The school has 1,200 male students from the surrounding area aged 11 to 18. To gain acceptance to the school, pupils must sit and pass the Eleven-plus exams, testing mathematics, English, and verbal reasoning.

Excellence in the fields of sport or arts is not grounds for special admission; however, many of its pupils compete at county, national and international level, or go on to study at film schools, conservatories and art houses.

History

An early Poole Grammar School was built in 1628 by Thomas Robarts, Mayor of Poole. This school taught “Latin grammar and kindred subjects” and saw moderate success in the 18th century, before a decline against “competition from nonconformist academies and the general economic decline of the town,” and eventual closure in 1835.

In 1902 the Board of Education approved funding for the construction of Poole Technical and Commercial School, offering “an education of a practical character for boys and girls of twelve years of age and upwards.” 
On 19 September 1904, following legal disputes between Poole Borough Council, Dorset County Council, and the Board of Education, on the interpretation of the Education Act 1902, the establishment of Poole Secondary School was reported by the Poole, Parkstone, and East Dorset Herald. Within its first two months of existence, Poole Secondary School was granted two acres of land at Seldown by Lord Wimborne. In 1907 the school's original site was built on this land for £6,500, to mixed reaction with some councillors regarding it as “squat”, but the Poole, Parkstone, and East Dorset Herald describing it as “one of the finest buildings in the town.” At this time, too, the first headmaster, A. J. Mockridge, was appointed, and around this time the current school colours were adopted. In 1909 a pupil of the school, Tim Aitken, participated in the first of Baden Powell's Scout camps on Brownsea Island.

“The immediate post war years also saw [Poole Secondary School] breach one of the last bastions of elite education when, in successive years, the first girl and then the first boy went to Oxford University.”
In 1927 Poole Secondary School was elevated to Grammar School status, following the Hadow Report. The 1930s were considered the school's "golden age", and in 1933 Poole Grammar School had the highest distinctions in French in England (3); two of the seventeen art distinctions awarded that year; and nine in history – "twice as many as any school in England". The school would go on to achieve the highest number of history distinctions in the country for two more successive years. In 1938 Poole Grammar had the highest number of School Certificate passes in the country, with an average pass rate of 87% during the late thirties, when the average grammar school pass rate was 60%.

In 1933 the Bournemouth Echo reported a governors meeting at Parkstone Grammar School decided that "Parkstone Grammar School should… become A School for Girls, and Poole Grammar School a School for Boys". This division was disliked by the then student body, with the debating society passing "This House Believes that Co-Education is the Best Education" by 97 votes to 15. This started the separation of boys and girls which is still in effect today. The two grammar schools have very close links as they are only around half a mile (0.8 km) apart. They share certain social activities, drama performances and a number of sixth form subjects including languages and ancient history.

Following the Second World War, Poole Grammar School admissions were solely boys who had passed the 11+, with the Education Act 1944 ending fee paying students.
In 1960 Poole Grammar School's current location between Broadstone and Canford Heath on the A349 (Gravel Hill) was identified as a countryside site for the much-needed expansion in size of the school. The original Seldown site is now a car park and National Express Coach pick up point. Work began on 30 April 1964 and the buildings were ceremonially opened by Princess Margaret on 11 October 1966. During this period Poole Grammar School was celebrated by the Sunday Times and in the House of Commons as an example of the success of the grammar school system, particularly because of the school's success at Balliol College, Oxford, where it was only beaten in successful applications "by a handful of major public schools". This success was not insignificant: Twenty-three places between 1950 and 1962.

A fire in 1971 caused £5,000 worth of damage to the school.

Between 2006 and 2009 the Ashley Thorne Building (named after a former and long serving governor of the school) was built to house the music and drama departments, as well as a new library. The latter has since been converted into Sixth Form study space and the library moved to its previous position in the school.

Uniform 

Poole Grammar students in Years 7–11 wear a uniform of a green blazer, black or grey trousers and a white shirt.  The boys in Years 7–8 wear a school tie without stripes, those in Year 9–11 wear a tie with stripes.

Once entering the sixth form, students may wear their own choice of clothing, though this must still include a shirt and tie, smart trousers and either brown or black shoes.

For sport, the boys are required to wear a white T-shirt, the school's green and yellow rugby jersey, black shorts and bottle green football socks. When attending science classes or certain Design Technology classes the boys are expected to bring a white lab coat.

Subjects 

Poole Grammar School mandates GCSEs in either double or triple science, English language and literature, mathematics, and religion and philosophy. The school also offers GCSEs in art, biology, computing and ICT, Design Technology (resistant Materials; graphics; food technology), drama, geography, history, foreign languages (French, German, and Spanish), and music.

Poole Grammar offers A-Levels in all of the above subjects, as well as ancient history, business studies, economics, geology, media studies, politics, psychology, and sociology.

Sports 
Sport is a major part of life at Poole Grammar, which has only had four heads of sport and physical education since the school was founded. The school owns large playing fields adjacent to the main buildings. They are used as football and rugby pitches, with two overlapping cricket fields and as a running track during the summer. Pupils also play sports on the school playground. The two large gyms provide changing facilities, a climbing wall, indoor volleyball courts and a room for weights and fitness training. The school boasts two astroturf tennis courts, installed in 2008, with a further two concrete courts on the playground used during the summer term. A multi-use games area was installed in 2010.  In 2021 Poole Grammar School was granted £3.8 million from the UK Government to build new sports facilities.

In 2022 Poole Grammar School's under 15s rugby side reached the finals of the national schools rugby, beating Dr. Challoner's Grammar School 22-12 in the semi-finals, and lost the national final 19-17 to Hill House School, Doncaster at the Saracen's Stadium at Barnet Copthall. Also in 2022 Poole Grammar School's inaugural croquet team beat Canford School.

The pupils partake in many sports throughout the year from football to tennis. During the winter term, pupils participate in rugby during their games lessons. During the spring term, the pupils play football. In the summer term, pupils play a variety of games including cricket, tennis and softball. Most of these sports contain an inter-form tournament towards the end of the term. Pupils competing in cross country running train on Canford Heath during lunch hour.

Year 7 Entry
The school has accepted pupils from the age of 11 (Year 7) since 2013 after a large-scale change to the structure of schooling in Poole. Large-scale construction work west of the main entrance between 2006 and 2009 added the Ashley Thorne Building, a three-storey wing housing four new classrooms, a new music department and a fully equipped drama studio which often hosts productions. Other smaller adjustments have been made around the school to help group subject lessons into rooms closer to each other. The location of the new buildings was chosen to prevent the reduction in the size of the school's playing fields, although the new food technology block was built where the athletics area used to be. A new rubber-surfaced pitch has also been built within this area, as well as a new set of long-jumping pits.

Headteachers
 Mr. John Dyson Esq. 1904-1906 (Chairman of Governors, no Headmaster yet appointed)
 Mr. G. E. Boyer, 1906-7
 Mr. Albert James Mockridge, 1907-1928
 Mr. Archibald Greenfield, 1928-1950
 Mr. Frank H. Stevens, 1950-1954
 Mr. John Cleave, 1954-1972 (after whom the school theatre is named)
 Mr. Nigel Gilpin, 1973-1990 (to whom the school's main hall is dedicated)
 Mr. Haydn Adams, 1990
 Mr. John Wheway, 1990
 Mr. Alex Clarke, 1990-2004
 Mr. Ian Carter, 2004-2014
 Mr. Andy Baker, 2014-2020 
 Dr. Amanda J Smith, 2020-

Notable former pupils

 Nick Aplin
 Edgar F. Codd, invented relational databases when at IBM's San Jose Research Laboratory in California
 Jim Cregan, musician
 Michael Joseph Crumpton FRS was Director of Research (Laboratories) for the Imperial Cancer Research Fund Laboratories (now part of Cancer Research UK)
 Prof Ronald P. Dore CBE
 John Finnemore, writer and actor
 Ant Henson, British singer-songwriter
 Paul Higham, cricketer
 Dave Lanning, sports commentator
 Richard Oakes, guitarist for the band Suede
 Harry Cornick, footballer with Luton Town
 Josh Carmichael, footballer with Weymouth
 Piers Copeland, Professional Athlete
 Jacob Peters, Professional Swimmer

See also
 List of schools in Bournemouth, Christchurch and Poole
 List of grammar schools in England

References

External links
 Poole Grammar School Website
Old Grammarians Website
 https://www.bournemouthecho.co.uk/news/15844168.gallery-110-pictures-poole-grammar-school-years/ (For images of the school)

Schools in Poole
Grammar schools in Bournemouth, Christchurch and Poole
Educational institutions established in 1904
Academies in Bournemouth, Christchurch and Poole
Boys' schools in Dorset
1904 establishments in England